Brownlow Cust, 1st Baron Brownlow  (3 December 1744 – 25 December 1807), of Belton House near Grantham in Lincolnshire (known as Sir Brownlow Cust, 4th Baronet, from 1770 to 1776), was a British Tory Member of Parliament.

Origins
He was the son and heir of Sir John Cust, 3rd Baronet (1718–1770), Speaker of the House of Commons, by his wife Etheldreda Payne, a daughter of Thomas Payne of Hough-on-the-Hill, Lincolnshire.

Career
Cust was educated at Eton College and Corpus Christi College, Cambridge. In 1766 he was elected as a Member of Parliament for Ilchester in Somerset, a seat he held until 1774, and then represented Grantham between 1774 and 1776, in which year he was raised to the peerage as Baron Brownlow, "of Belton in the County of Lincoln". The peerage was chiefly in recognition of his father's services, and the name of his title refers to his paternal grandmother Anne Brownlow (Lady Cust), sister and heiress in her issue of John Brownlow, 1st Viscount Tyrconnel (1690–1754), of Belton House, and wife of Sir Richard Cust, 2nd Baronet. In 1776 he was made a Fellow of the Society of Antiquaries of London and in 1783 was made a Fellow of the Royal Society.

Belton House
 
In 1779 Cust inherited Belton House, near Grantham in Lincolnshire, under the will of his paternal grandmother, Anne Brownlow (Lady Cust), wife of Sir Richard Cust, 2nd Baronet and sister, and in her issue heiress, of John Brownlow, 1st Viscount Tyrconnel (1690–1754), of Belton House.

Marriages and progeny
Cust married twice:

Firstly, in 1770, to Jocosa Katherina Drury (d. 1772), daughter and heiress of Sir Thomas Drury, 1st Baronet (1712–1759) of Overstone in Northamptonshire, by whom he had one daughter. His wife died two years after the marriage.

Secondly, in 1775, to Frances Bankes, daughter and heiress of Sir Henry Bankes of Wimbledon in Surrey, by whom he had five sons and one daughter:
John Cust, 1st Earl Brownlow, 1st Viscount Alford, 2nd Baron Brownlow, 5th Baronet (1779–1853), eldest son and heir, in 1815 created Earl Brownlow and Viscount Alford, a Member of Parliament for Lincolnshire and for Clitheroe in Lancashire;
Rev. Henry Cockayne Cust (1780–1861), Canon of Windsor;
William Cust (1787–1845), MP;
Peregrine Cust (1791–1873), MP;
Sir Edward Cust, 1st Baronet (1794–1878), a soldier and politician, who in 1876 was created a baronet "of Leasowe Castle in the County of Chester".
Anne Cust (1796–1867), who married Sir William Fowle Middleton, 2nd Baronet.

Arms

References

1744 births
1807 deaths
People educated at Eton College
Alumni of Corpus Christi College, Cambridge
Barons Brownlow
Peers of Great Britain created by George III
Members of the Parliament of Great Britain for English constituencies
British MPs 1761–1768
British MPs 1768–1774
British MPs 1774–1780
Fellows of the Royal Society
Fellows of the Society of Antiquaries of London
Brownlow
Tory members of the Parliament of Great Britain